Helga de Alvear (born 1936) is a German-Spanish art collector and art dealer.

Early life and education
De Alvear was born in the city of Kirn/Nahe (Rheinland-Pfalz), Germany, in 1936. She studied at the Salem School near Lake Constance, and subsequently in Lausanne and Geneva, Switzerland. She furthered her studies afterwards in London for a year.

In 1957 De Alvear travelled to Spain to learn Spanish and met the architect Jaime de Alvear. They married in 1959 and she set up residence in Madrid. They have three children, Maria, Ana and Patricia.

Career

Early beginnings
In 1967 Helga de Alvear met Juana Mordó and began what would later turn into her art collection. She came into contact with artists from the Cuenca group and from the El Paso group and she became increasingly interested in the Spanish art scene. In January 1980 she started to work at the Juana Mordó gallery. Here, she was able to hone her knowledge about the international art scene.

Galería Helga de Alvear
De Alvear continued to be involved in the Juana Mordó gallery for the next 4 years, and in 1984, when Mordó died, she took the helm. Over the next 10 years she followed in the artistic and professional footsteps of her mentor.

In 1995, De Alvear decided to take a turn in her career by opening a new gallery under her own name in a space measuring more than 900 square meters next to the Reina Sofía Museum. Many of her projects championed international contemporary art with a special emphasis on photography, video and installation – at a time when these mediums were practically unknown in Spain.
Today, Helga de Alvear's project is one of the best-established and longest-running art galleries on the Spanish scene.   and it has earned widespread international acclaim.

Among others, the gallery has been representing the following living artists:
 Angela Bulloch
 Thomas Demand
 Elmgreen & Dragset
 Axel Hütte
 Isaac Julien
 Imi Knoebel
 Karin Sander
 Santiago Sierra

Fundación Helga de Alvear Visual Arts Centre
De Alvear's collection, including more than 2,500 pieces by Spanish and international artists, have been part of the Fundación Helga de Alvear since 2006, a joint initiative with the Regional Government of Extremadura. The first phase of the Fundación Helga de Alvear Visual Arts Centre, based in an early 20th-century building known as Casa Grande, opened in the historic quarter of Cáceres in 2010. From 2015 until 2021, Spanish architects Mansilla + Tuñón Architects built a 8,000 sq. m annexe building. The cost of the new museum was around €10 million with half of the funds coming from De Alvear herself and half from institutions in Extremadura. The mission of the collection is also to contribute to public awareness about art and it often loans out works to institutions around the world. In addition, it has been the subject of a number of in-depth exhibitions, most importantly:

Other activities
Amid the COVID-19 pandemic in Spain, de Alvear donated €1 million (about $1.1 million) to efforts dedicated to finding a vaccine. The funds were directed toward research conducted by Luis Enjuanes, a virologist for the Spanish National Research Council (CSIC).

Recognition
De Alvear was awarded the Medal of Extremadura in 2007, the Gold Medal for Merit in the category of Fine Arts (bestowed by the Spanish Ministry of Culture) in 2008, the Medal of Cáceres in 2011 and Fundación Arte y Mecenazgo Award in the category of Collector in 2012.

References

OBRIST, Hans Ulrich (Ed.). Conversations in Cáceres with Hans Ulrich Obrist. Cáceres: Centro de Artes Visuales Fundación Helga de Alvear, 2012. 
WYSS, Kurt. Looking back at Art Basel. Basel: Schwabe AG Verlag, 2009. 
HERSTATT, Claudia. Women Gallerists in the 20th and 21st Centuries. Ostfildern: Hatje Cantz Verlaj, 2008. 
BENHAMOU-HUET, Judith. Global Collectors/Collectionneurs du monde. Prologue by Samuel Keller. Paris: Éditions Phébus, 2008; Bordeaux: Éditions Cinq Sens, 2008. 478 p. .

External links
 
 Official website of Centro de Artes Visuales Fundación Helga de Alvear, Cáceres

1936 births
Living people
Spanish art collectors
Women art dealers
Alumni of Schule Schloss Salem
German art collectors
German expatriates in Switzerland
German expatriates in the United Kingdom
German emigrants to Spain